National Highway 321G, commonly referred to as NH 321G is a national highway in India. It is a spur road of National Highway 21.  NH-321 runs in the state of Uttar Pradesh in India. Jalesar to Awagarh

Route 
NH321G connects Jalesar and Awagarh in the state of Uttar Pradesh.

Junctions  
 
  Terminal near Jalesar.

  Terminals near Awagarh.

See also 
 List of National Highways in India
 List of National Highways in India by state
List of State Highways in Uttar Pradesh

References

External links 

 NH 321G on OpenStreetMap

National highways in India
National Highways in Uttar Pradesh